Donna Pfautsch (born August 19, 1951) is an American politician. She is a member of the Missouri House of Representatives, having served since 2013. She is a member of the Republican Party.

References

1951 births
Living people
People from Harrisonville, Missouri
Women state legislators in Missouri
Republican Party members of the Missouri House of Representatives
21st-century American politicians
21st-century American women politicians